Gdynia Orłowo railway station is a railway station serving the city of Gdynia, in the Pomeranian Voivodeship, Poland. The station was built between 1927 and 1928 and is located in the Orłowo district on the Gdańsk–Stargard railway and the parallel Gdańsk Śródmieście–Rumia railway. The train services are operated by Przewozy Regionalne and SKM Tricity.

When the station opened it was known as Orłowo Morskie, as it did not become part of Gdynia until 1935. In the years 1928-1939 the station functioned as the border station with the Free City of Danzig (Gdańsk). Before World War II and shortly afterwards, the station had a ticket office, cash luggage, waiting room and a buffet. In 2014 the regional platforms were modernised, including the construction of a new platform, the track and signalling equipment.

Train services
The station is served by the following services:

Regional services (R) Tczew — Gdynia Chylonia 
Regional services (R) Tczew — Słupsk  
Regional services (R) Malbork — Słupsk  
Regional services (R) Malbork — Gdynia Chylonia 
Regional services (R) Elbląg — Gdynia Chylonia 
Regional services (R) Elbląg — Słupsk  
Regional services (R) Chojnice — Tczew — Gdynia Główna 
Regional services (R) Gdynia Chylonia — Smętowo 
Regional services (R) Gdynia Chylonia — Laskowice Pomorskie 
Regional services (R) Gdynia Chylonia — Bydgoszcz Główna 
Regional services (R) Słupsk — Bydgoszcz Główna 
Pomorska Kolej Metropolitalna services (R) Kościerzyna — Gdańsk Port Lotniczy (Airport) — Gdańsk Wrzeszcz — Gdynia Główna
Szybka Kolej Miejska services (SKM) (Lębork -) Wejherowo - Reda - Rumia - Gdynia - Sopot - Gdansk

References

 This article is based upon a translation of the Polish language version as of October 2016.

External links

Railway stations served by Szybka Kolej Miejska (Tricity)
Orlowo
Railway stations served by Przewozy Regionalne InterRegio
Railway stations in Poland opened in 1928